AV Turicia is a color-bearing student society in Zürich. It was founded in 1860. It is a section of the Swiss Student Association and a member of the "Federation of Student Komment Societies" (also known as "Block"). It is the oldest university group within the Federation, which was founded in 1841.

Purpose
The Turicia is an association under the Swiss Civil Code with its seat in Zurich. It promotes friendship between its members. Based on the foundation of Christianity it aims to contribute to the shaping of the state and society by promoting students' knowledge of their own history and their responsibility for the heritage of the Catholic Church.

History

Founding of the Zurich section of the Swiss Student Organization
The November Book of the “Monat-Rosen” tells of the founding of the Zurich section of the Swiss Student Association in 1860. It was founded by ETH student Anton Petrelli and four medical students: Franz Bridler, Paul Egger, Robert Lenz, and Ernst Müller. In December, a standing semester joined the group, which met on Fridays. On January 11, 1861, during the first “Komitee” the group elected Fintan Bärlocher (a medical student from Rheintal) as “Senior” to their first “Präses”.

Issues during the early years
A letter to the Section of Lucerne shows the kind of problems the six students were facing at the time. They were among the first members of the StV, who didn't study exclusively at Catholic universities any more. More and more they turned to the time-honoured “Alma Mater Basiliensis” and the Institutes of Zurich and Bern. So it was not surprising, that in Protestant Zurich the members of the section joined forces with members of other Catholic groups such as the “Gesellenverein” and the church choir in order to, beyond maintaining conviviality, preserve and enhance the rights of the Catholic minority in Zurich.

Breakthrough and rise of Turicia
In the time of the culture war in 1873, the Catholics were driven from the church of Augustin and brought together in the newly built church St. Peter and Paul in Aussersihl. In the eighties fraternity achieved its breakthrough: during the summer semester of 1883 the section was recognized as the “Catholic Student Organization Turicia”, and during the winter semester of 1883/84 it was incorporated into the “Allgemeine Studentenversammlung”. With the decision of the AC on December 8, 1885, the red-white-green sash and the red hat were worn in public. In February 1886 they celebrated their 25th anniversary. On the occasion of the GV Sursee in 1886 the “Dreibund” of the color-wearing academic organizations AKV Rauracia, AKV Burgundia, and AV Turicia was celebrated, which was to actively support a firm section- and organization-life within the Swiss StV in the coming decades.

Stronghold of the leading Zurich Catholics
The rich and often to this day preserved archives tell of a rising color-student “feudalsystem”, which experienced its height during the turn of the century in Zurich. The Turicia, in which all national languages were spoken at times, is assisted in its efforts by an active alumni-community. On 1 March 1887 she was presided over first by the two ministers Karl Reichlin and Josef Burtscher, and then twenty years by Dr. med. Emil Pestalozzi-Pfyffer. Out of the ever-growing brotherhood from various layers of society grows an understanding of the meaning for social questions, which they sought to incorporate into the entire StV. They also stand for their efforts for a like-minded political assembly on a cantonal and national level. There were a lot of names connected with public service: the first chief editor of the Neue Zürcher Nachrichten and founder of the Christian Social Party of the canton, Dr. Georg Baumberger, his successor Dr. Ludwig Schneller, the first CSP cantonal council president Dr. Conrad Bürgi, those who were by and large responsible for the founding of the Swiss Catholic People's Party Adabert Wirz and Josef Düring, as well as the former national councilmen Philipp Etter.

Second flag dedication, color change, and choice of motto
With the beginning of the 20th century the 60 members strong Turicia experienced a moving time. The idea of a fraternity house near the university was being discussed with the alumni, while the secession within the Activitas was being rehearsed at a secret meeting. During the second flag dedication they changed their color to orange and chose the motto “In fide firmitas”. In May 1911 AV Turicia celebrated its 50th anniversary.

The Kyburger
On February 24, 1912, the fraternity decides to found a sister organization by selecting some of its own members to be part of the new pink-white-green “Kyburger”. As earlier with the Turania, GV Gallensis, Corvina, and GV Desertina, the Turicia acted as godfather during their first flagdedication in the summer of 1912. Their relationship had its ups and downs, which the, until the year 1944 existing combined alumni sought to even out. However the Turicia can in many matters of interest count on the support of the Kyburger.

In the shadow of the World War II
In the year 1935 the AV Turicia celebrates its 75th anniversary and dedicates their third flag. The contradiction of a national upheaval and the threatening time of the Second World War shaped the AV Turicia. The cofounding of the new “Block” of the old “Kommentverbindungen” during the summer of 1942 is to be seen as a sign of perseverance, which the StV did for the preservation of Swiss freedom. After the war the Turicia tries to strengthen the German and Austrian “Cartellverbände”, by forging friendly bonds with the Alpina Innsbruck and the Hohentwiel Stuttgart, in whose place the relationships with the K. D. St. V. Winfridia of Münster and the K. D. St. V. Trifels of Munich still exist until today.

Block exit and 1968
The insult other block-members against the AV Turicia, in the context of the election of a non-block-member to central president, resulted in the withdrawal of the AV Turicia during the winter semester 1951/52 from the bond of academic “Kommentverbindungen”. A time of new freedom begins. Even on its own they prepared for the 100th anniversary in late autumn 1960. They come to the brave decision to buy a house for the fraternity. In May 1968 the alumni have to overcome the idea of abolishing the “Farbenobligatorium”. However the actives, while working on the politico-educational manifesto of Freiburg and the socio-political “Leitbild”, didn't want to ostracize the Turicer which were SP-members.

Crisis and resurgence
With the forced vacating of the “Stammlokal Feldschlösschen” the Turicia found itself homeless. Through a history weekend, organized by the activitas, the Turicia set free new forces by contemplating their own history. The development of the Turicer-Info strengthened their community. They also refurnished the house on the Nordstrasse 22, which together with the new “Stammlokal Urania” became the center of Turicia life. Even with a small number of members they strived to renew their organization and regain their place in the entire StV. They went on to provide five CC-Members and a CP in the following years.

References
info Turicia, Jubiläumsausgabe "125 Jahre Turicia", Nr. 36, Zürich, 2. Mai 1985, Böhi v/o Rock

External links

 http://www.turicia.ch
 http://www.1860.ch

Turicia, AV
Turicia, AV
University of Zurich
Student organizations established in 1860
1860 establishments in Switzerland